Mohammed Yousef Samy (born 4 November 1985) is a former soccer player who played as a defender. Born in the United States, he was an Afghanistan international.

Career

Samy started his career with American fourth tier side San Francisco Seals.

References

External links
 

1985 births
Afghanistan international footballers
Afghan footballers
American people of Afghan descent
American soccer players
Association football defenders
National Premier Soccer League players
Saint Mary's Gaels men's soccer players
San Francisco Seals (soccer) players
San Jose State Spartans men's soccer players
USL League Two players
Living people